Karmaskaly is the name of two rural localities in the Republic of Bashkortostan, Russia:
Karmaskaly, Karmaskalinsky District, Republic of Bashkortostan, a selo in Karmaskalinsky Selsoviet of Karmaskalinsky District; 
Karmaskaly, Sterlitamaksky District, Republic of Bashkortostan, a selo in Kazadayevsky Selsoviet of Sterlitamaksky District;